La Junta is a home rule municipality in, the county seat of, and the most populous municipality of Otero County, Colorado, United States. The city population was 7,322 at the 2020 United States Census.

History
La Junta (Spanish for "the junction") was named for the fact it rested at the intersection of the Santa Fe Trail and a pioneer road to Pueblo. The town developed near Bent's Fort, a fur trading post of the 19th century.

During World War II, La Junta had an Army Air Force Training Base outside town.  An Air Force detachment of the Strategic Air Command remained there until modern flight simulators developed in the 1980s rendered live flight unnecessary for pilot training maneuvers.  At least one military aircraft crashed close by during such training maneuvers.

Geography and climate
The area is high plains terrain, dry with short grass prairie and sagebrush, and is part of the Southwestern Tablelands ecological region. This area of Colorado is often the warmest. Summer brings numerous days above 100 °F (38 °C). On July 20, 2005, many cities in this region broke or tied heat records. La Junta reached 107 °F (42 °C) with an overnight low of 87 °F (31 °C). However, the all-time record high for La Junta occurred on July 20, 1998,  with a temperature of 113 °F (45 °C).

Demographics

There were 7,568 people, 2,977 households, and 1,964 families residing in the city. The racial makeup of the city was 74.22% White, 1.22% African American, 1.77% Native American, 0.86% Asian, 0.13% Pacific Islander, 18.33% from other races, and 3.48% from two or more races. Hispanic or Latino of any race were 43.60% of the population.

There were 2,977 households, out of which 33.7% had children under the age of 18 living with them, 47.0% were married couples living together, 14.7% had a female householder with no husband present, and 34.0% were non-families. 30.9% of all households were made up of individuals, and 15.0% had someone living alone who was 65 years of age or older. The average household size was 2.44 and the average family size was 3.06.

In the city, the population was spread out, with 27.1% under the age of 18, 10.4% from 18 to 24, 24.6% from 25 to 44, 21.4% from 45 to 64, and 16.6% who were 65 years of age or older. The median age was 36 years. For every 100 females, there were 89.2 males. For every 100 females age 18 and over, there were 84.1 males.

The median income for a household in the city was $29,002, and the median income for a family was $36,398. Males had a median income of $26,325 versus $21,324 for females. The per capita income for the city was $14,928. About 16.8% of families and 21.4% of the population were below the poverty line, including 31.4% of those under age 18 and 10.0% of those age 65 or over.

Arts and culture
Tourists come to see tarantulas who are looking for mates during the cooler weather in September and into October each year. Bent's Old Fort National Historic Site, an important trading post along the Santa Fe Trail, is northeast of La Junta. The Koshare Indian Museum, housed at Otero College, holds a collection of Native American artifacts. The Koshare Indian museum hosts a unique Boy Scout/Explorer program which trains the Scouts in both Native American dance and building traditional outfits. The Scouts give dance performances during the summer and also host Scout troops from other areas. Purgatoire River track site, one of the largest dinosaur track sites in North America, is south of La Junta.

The Caboose is the drive-through for the State Bank, which was established in 1893. The bank has been remodeled with antiques, including a teller line from the late 1890s.

Media
The city is served by the daily newspaper The Tribune-Democrat.
The city is also served by a local radio station that broadcasts in AM and FM. They are KBLJ 1400 AM and KTHN 92.1 FM.

Infrastructure

Transportation

La Junta, until recently, had a railroad yard for assembling freight trains for the climb over Raton Pass. BNSF runs freight trains between Denver and Kansas/Texas via La Junta.  The sole remaining major train crossing Raton Pass today is the daily Southwest Chief, in both directions, between Los Angeles and Chicago.

U.S. Highway 50 travels through La Junta, approaching from Pueblo to the northwest and continuing eastward towards Lamar and into Kansas. U.S. Highway 350 begins at La Junta and travels southwest before reaching Trinidad. State Highway 10 also begins at La Junta and travels west-southwest before reaching Walsenburg.

The city operates a public bus system with one route that circles the city. Intercity transportation is provided by Bustang. La Junta is part of the Lamar-Pueblo-Colorado Springs Outrider line.

Health care
The city and region are served by the Arkansas Valley Regional Medical Center, located in La Junta.

Notable people

Notable individuals who were born in La Junta include rodeo cowboy legend Lane Frost, novelists William Charles Anderson and Ken Kesey, baseball pitcher Tippy Martinez and U.S. Army Col. Wendell Fertig, who led a guerrilla force against the Japanese in the Philippines during World War II.

In popular culture
 The Terrence Malick motion picture Badlands (1973), starring Martin Sheen and Sissy Spacek filmed scenes in and around La Junta.
 Richard Fleischer's Mr. Majestyk (1974), starring Charles Bronson, used several exteriors and interiors in La Junta, including the hospital and police station, as well as Main Street for the downtown gun battle, and various streets in town for parts of the car chase.
 Scenes for the 1978-79 TV mini-series, Centennial, were filmed at Bent's Old Fort National Historic Site, just east of La Junta.
 In The Net (1995), Sandra Bullock's character Angela Bennett is from La Junta.
 In the 1946 movie Without Reservations starring John Wayne and Claudette Colbert, they become stranded at the La Junta train station. Wayne's character is a Marine Corps pilot and they go to the Army Air Field to try to catch a flight to California.

See also

 List of municipalities in Colorado

References

External links

 

Cities in Otero County, Colorado
Cities in Colorado
County seats in Colorado
Populated places established in 1881
Colorado populated places on the Arkansas River
1881 establishments in Colorado